Rhoads-Lorah House and Barn, also known as "Five Springs Farm," is a historic home and barn located in Amity Township, Berks County, Pennsylvania.   It was built about 1830, and is a -story, five bay, limestone dwelling in the Georgian style. It measures 42 feet by 20 feet.  It is attached to an earlier two-story, 17 feet by 17 feet, stone dwelling, making a "T"-shape.  The stone barn was also built about 1830, and measures 66 feet by 41 feet.  Also on the property are a contributing springhouse, drive-through corn crib, and machinery shed.

It was listed on the National Register of Historic Places in 2007.

References

Houses on the National Register of Historic Places in Pennsylvania
Georgian architecture in Pennsylvania
Houses completed in 1830
Houses in Berks County, Pennsylvania
1830 establishments in Pennsylvania
National Register of Historic Places in Berks County, Pennsylvania